Ahlam Youssef (born 5 December 1999) is an Egyptian karateka. She won the gold medal in the women's 55 kg event at the 2021 World Karate Championships held in Dubai, United Arab Emirates. She also won the gold medal in her event at the 2021 African Karate Championships held in Cairo, Egypt.

She won the silver medal in the women's 55 kg event at the 2022 Mediterranean Games held in Oran, Algeria. She also won the silver medal in the women's 55 kg event at the 2022 World Games held in Birmingham, United States.

Achievements

References 

Living people
1999 births
Place of birth missing (living people)
Egyptian female karateka
Competitors at the 2022 Mediterranean Games
Mediterranean Games medalists in karate
Mediterranean Games silver medalists for Egypt
Competitors at the 2022 World Games
World Games silver medalists
World Games medalists in karate
21st-century Egyptian women